The 1996–97 FIRA Tournament was the 32nd edition of the European rugby union championship for national teams organized by the Fédération Internationale de Rugby Amateur (FIRA).

France, Italy and Romania did not participate, in order to privilege other appointments. France and Italy had to play the final of the previous trophy, due to the large number of international matches, only on 23 March 1997, after this tournament was started. Both countries were not interested to continue to participate in the FIRA senior competitions and this would be their last presence at the competition.

The tournament had a new formula. Twelve teams were divided into four pools of 3 teams. After a round robin, they were ranked in 3 groups to define the ranking, also valid to divide the Teams for the second round qualification to 1999 Rugby World Cup.

There was no second division, the other 18 European teams played the first round of qualification to the 1999 Rugby World Cup.

Spain and Portugal qualified for the First Place final, which was won by the Spaniards by 25-18.

First round

Pool A

Pool B

Pool C

Pool D

Second round 

 First to Fourth places Semifinals

 5th to 8th places Semifinals

 9th to 12th places Semifinals

Finals 

 First Place Final

 3rd-place final

 5th-place final

 7th-place final

 9th-place final

 11th-place final

Final ranking

Bibliography 
 Francesco Volpe, Valerio Vecchiarelli (2000), 2000 Italia in Meta, Storia della nazionale italiana di rugby dagli albori al Sei Nazioni, GS Editore (2000) .
 Francesco Volpe, Paolo Pacitti (Author), Rugby 2000, GTE Gruppo Editorale (1999).

External links
1996-97 FIRA Tournament at ESPN

1996-97
1996–97 in European rugby union
1996 rugby union tournaments for national teams
1997 rugby union tournaments for national teams